Chidlowia is a genus of flowering plants in the family Fabaceae. It belongs to the mimosoid clade of the subfamily Caesalpinioideae. It contains a single species, Chidlowia sanguinea.

References

External links 

Mimosoids
Monotypic Fabaceae genera
Taxa named by William Evans Hoyle